Superliner may refer to:
Superliner (passenger ship), an ocean liner of more than 10,000 gross tons
Superliner (railcar), a double-decker passenger car used by Amtrak 
Mack Super-Liner, a heavy-duty truck manufactured by Mack Trucks